Beautiful Boy is a 2018 American biographical drama film directed by Felix van Groeningen, in his English-language feature debut. The screenplay, written by Luke Davies and van Groeningen, is based on the memoirs Beautiful Boy: A Father's Journey Through His Son's Addiction by David Sheff and Tweak: Growing Up on Methamphetamines by Nic Sheff. The film stars Steve Carell, Timothée Chalamet, Maura Tierney, and Amy Ryan, and deals with a father-son relationship increasingly strained by the latter's drug addiction.

Beautiful Boy had its world premiere at the Toronto International Film Festival on September 7, 2018, and was theatrically released in the United States on October 12, 2018, by Amazon Studios. The film was a box-office disappointment, grossing $16 million on a $25 million budget. However, it received generally positive reviews from critics, who praised the performances of Carell and Chalamet. For his work, Chalamet earned nominations at the Golden Globes, Screen Actors Guild Awards, BAFTA Awards and Critics’ Choice Awards, among others.

Plot
New York Times writer David Sheff’s teenage son Nicolas "Nic" Sheff goes missing, reappearing in their home two days later. Seeing obvious signs of drug use, David takes Nic to a rehab clinic. Progress is made, and Nic transfers to a halfway house, with the agreement of Nic's doctors. Days later, Nic disappears, and David finds him in the streets.

Back at the rehab facility, Nic reveals that he has been taking numerous drugs, including crystal meth. Nic eventually completes his rehab program, and seeing his improvements, combined with wishful thinking, David allows him to go away to college on his own, to become a writer. Nic's newfound freedom and sobriety start well, as he becomes a good student, and starts a relationship with his classmate, Julia. During a happy family dinner at his girlfriend's parents' house, Nic finds a bottle of pills in their medicine cabinet and swallows one. After this incident, he slowly relapses, causing Julia to break up with him, and his substance use to escalate until he eventually purchases heroin. Around this time, beginning to become suspicious of his slowly changing behavior, David decides to read Nic's diary. To his horror, Nic has filled half the pages by colorfully describing his growing addictions through worrying words and disturbing cartoons. On one of the last pages, Nic writes of his difficulty obtaining meth in college, but that he managed to score some heroin.

Returning home, David senses that Nic is using again, and Nic leaves of his own accord, feeling claustrophobic from his dad's suspicions about his drug use. David and Nic finally meet up, and Nic asks his dad for money, so he can go to New York. Knowing the money will almost certainly go towards drugs, David declines, and Nic angrily leaves. David later gets a call from a New York hospital saying Nic has overdosed. David flies there to retrieve him, and after talking to his ex-wife and Nic's mother Vicki, he decides Nic should be sent to live with her in Los Angeles.

Nic has a fresh start in Los Angeles. He attends 12 step meetings, spends time with his sponsor Spencer, and even works at a drug clinic to help newer patients overcome their addiction. Fourteen months sober, Nic drives to visit David and his family. Seeing Nic back to his old self, interacting happily with his two younger half-siblings, David is proud of his son's newfound sobriety, as is his wife Karen. As he departs from their home, however, Nic has a sudden surge of depression, resents his sobriety, and fears relapsing. Spencer gives Nic moral support over the phone, but to little avail. Later that night, Nic drives into San Francisco, where he runs into Lauren, a fellow drug addict from his past, and confesses his desire to "party," despite having been clean for quite some time. The two buy various drugs in the streets, which they proceed to inject together at Lauren's place, where they have sex.

When he learns Nic has gone missing again, David prepares to look for him, but Karen protests that he has done everything he can for Nic, and he cannot do anything to fix his addiction, which David heartbrokenly accepts. One day Nic and Lauren break into the home while David and his family are not there, and retrieve some valuable items. The family come home, and the two quickly depart. At first, they go undetected, but David's other son Jasper notices Nic, and both David and Karen go to find them. Karen chases them in their car but stops and lets them drive off.

Lauren overdoses, but is revived by Nic and is sent to the hospital. Nic tearfully calls David and asks for permission to come home, which his father declines. Nic continues to plead, but David hangs up and breaks down in tears. Despairing, Nic overdoses, but he survives. David and Vicki visit him in the hospital, and David and Nic tearfully embrace.

Closing titles reveal Nic has been sober for eight years, and it would not have been possible without the love and support of his family and friends.

Cast
 Steve Carell as David Sheff
 Timothée Chalamet as Nicolas "Nic" Sheff
 Jack Dylan Grazer as 12-year-old Nic Sheff
 Zachary Rifkin as 8-year-old Nic Sheff
 Kue Lawrence as 4 and 6-year-old Nic Sheff
 Maura Tierney as Karen Barbour-Sheff
 Kaitlyn Dever as Lauren
 LisaGay Hamilton as Rose
 Timothy Hutton as Dr. Brown
 Andre Royo as Spencer
 Amy Ryan as Vicki Sheff
 Amy Forsyth as Diane
 Ricky Low as Destiny
Stefanie Scott as Julia

Production
In 2008, it was announced that Paramount Pictures and Plan B Entertainment had acquired film rights to the books Beautiful Boy: A Father's Journey Through His Son's Addiction, by David Sheff, and Tweak: Growing Up on Methamphetamines, by his son Nic Sheff. Both are about Nic's addiction and eventual recovery. The studio and producers were announcing that they would use the recently published books to frame a picture about drug addiction, from the perspective of both a young meth addict and the father who finds himself helpless to stop his son's downward spiral. In 2011, it was announced that writer and director Cameron Crowe had written a script based on the books. In 2012, TheWrap reported that Crowe was looking to direct the film from his own script after wrapping his romantic film Aloha, with New Regency becoming involved in the project after Paramount dropped out.  In December 2013, it was reported that Mark Wahlberg was circling the role of David Sheff, with Crowe still attached to direct.

In 2015, Variety announced that Belgian director Felix van Groeningen had taken over as director, with a new script written by Australian writer Luke Davies. In January 2017, it was reported that Steve Carell and Will Poulter were attached to star in the project, as the father and son, respectively. Dede Gardner, Jeremy Kleiner and Brad Pitt were the main producers. In February 2017, Timothée Chalamet was officially cast in the film as Nic Sheff, opposite Carell as his character's father. In 2018, van Groeningen said that out of more than 200 tapes he received from actors auditioning for the role of Nic, Chalamet immediately stood out. He added, "while we deliberately did not choose a [well-known actor] at the time of the auditions... there is less burden, now of course, it's great... Nobody had foreseen that he would suddenly become world-famous, but it is completely deserved. If [his fame] can help bring young people to the cinema, I can only applaud it." In March 2017, Amy Ryan, Maura Tierney, Kaitlyn Dever, Timothy Hutton, and LisaGay Hamilton joined the cast of the film. This marked a return for Carell and Ryan starring together (additionally as an on-screen couple) since season 7 of The Office. In April 2017, Andre Royo joined as well. Prior to filming, van Groeningen arranged for two weeks of rehearsals with the cast, a common practice in productions in his native Belgium but not in Hollywood.

Filming
Principal photography began on March 27, 2017 and lasted through May 2017 in and around Los Angeles and San Francisco. Production designer Ethan Tobman used the house from the TV series Big Little Lies for a set, to which he made numerous alterations including to the counters.

The first scenes shot for the film were the most intense, according to van Groeningen, and involved Chalamet's character being hospitalized for a drug overdose. Chalamet was instructed to lose weight a couple weeks before the filming of the "hospitalization scenes," and subsequently rested to recover in order to complete the rest of the shoot. Chalamet has stated that there were numerous "doctor visits" and "close calls" during the shoot, saying, "your mind knows you're acting. But when you drop twenty pounds and you are under a rain machine for eight takes in a T-shirt—your body doesn't know you're acting."

The editing of the film took seven months in total, during which the movie was completely recut multiple times. Initially Nico Leunen, van Groeningen's long-time collaborator, was not involved in the project; however, van Groeningen became dissatisfied with the editing process and brought Leunen to Los Angeles to reconstruct the film.

Release
Beautiful Boy had its world premiere at the Toronto International Film Festival on September 7, 2018, with the cast and director in attendance, along with David and Nic Sheff making a surprise appearance after the premiere. The film was theatrically released in the United States on October 12, 2018, and was released in the United Kingdom on January 18, 2019. The film was made available to stream on Amazon Prime on January 3, 2019.

Reception

Critical response

The website's critical consensus reads, "Beautiful Boy sees Timothée Chalamet and Steve Carell delivering showcase work that's often powerful enough to make up for the story's muted emotional impact." On Metacritic, the film has a weighted average score of 62 out of 100, based on 45 critics, indicating "generally favorable reviews."

There has been some criticism that the film omits a key element of Nic's story - that he worked as a gay hustler in San Francisco and New York to fund his drug addiction, even though Nic identified as heterosexual. This is covered in Nic's own memoir but not covered at all in the film.

Accolades

References

External links 
 
 
 
 

2018 films
2018 biographical drama films
Amazon Studios films
American biographical drama films
Biographical films about writers
Films about father–son relationships
Films about drugs
Films about parenting
Films based on memoirs
Films based on multiple works
Films directed by Felix van Groeningen
Films produced by Brad Pitt
Films set in Los Angeles
Films set in San Francisco
Films shot in Los Angeles
Films shot in San Francisco
Plan B Entertainment films
2010s English-language films
2010s American films